The Alpine A522 is a Formula One racing car designed and constructed by the BWT Alpine F1 Team and competed in the 2022 Formula One World Championship. The car was driven by Fernando Alonso and Esteban Ocon. The chassis is Alpine's first car under the 2022 technical regulations.

Livery
It ran in two liveries, a predominantly blue livery for most of the season, and a predominantly pink car for the first two races.

Competition history
The car was generally about as competitive as its predecessor, the A521, and was regularly in the hunt for points at races, but not usually troubling the top teams. One of the car's key strengths is its top speed, which was particularly evident in races such as Baku, where it was noted that other cars could not catch the A522 on the straightaways, despite the advantage of DRS. The team had reliability problems in several races, however the team beat McLaren to 4th in the constructors' championship - their best finish since 2018.

Complete Formula One results
(key)

References

External links 

A522
2022 Formula One season cars